From 1929 to 1933, 251 infants in Lübeck, northern Germany, were given three doses of the BCG vaccine against tuberculosis, which was accidentally contaminated with the bacteria responsible for the disease. 173 later developed signs of the illness and 72 died.


Contaminated vaccine 
The event later became known as the Lübeck disaster, or in German, the Lübecker Impfunglück (Lübeck vaccine disaster). Major scientific journals worldwide commented on the disaster and subsequent trials of the medical staff, such as The Lancet and the Journal of the American Medical Association.

Legal consequences 
On 6 February 1932, the head of the general hospital in Lübeck, was found guilty of negligent homicide and negligent bodily harm, and sentenced to two years in prison. Deycke negligently cultivated the BCG vaccine in a laboratory unsuitable for vaccine production and refrained from animal experiments.  was sentenced to 15 months in prison for negligent homicide and negligent bodily harm as he did not test the vaccine in animal experiments and only insufficiently observed the children. The co-accused chairman of the Lübeck health department, was acquitted, as was Deycke's laboratory assistant, Anna Schütze.

As a result of negative public opinion on the BCG vaccine, caused by media reports, the Weimar government de facto stopped all compulsory vaccination. Compulsory BCG vaccination of infants was reinstated in East Germany in 1952.

References 

Health disasters in Germany
1930s health disasters
Vaccine controversies